WHGS may refer to:

 WHGS (AM), radio station in South Carolina
 William Hulme's Grammar School, school in Manchester